Khndzoresk is a village in the Goris Municipality of the Syunik Province in Armenia. The village is located to the east of the Goris-Stepanakert highway, on the steep slopes of Khor Dzor (Deep Gorge), which the village is named after, according to tradition.

Crossing the bridge at the entrance of the village, the road continues towards the towns of Lachin and Stepanakert. New Khndzoresk (the current inhabited area) was built in the 1950s.

Demographics 
According to the 1897 census, Khndzoresk—mentioned as Khinzirak—had a population of 4,516, all Armenian Apostolics. The village had 2,295 men and 2,221 women.

The National Statistical Service of the Republic of Armenia (ARMSTAT) reported its population as 2,260 in 2010, up from 1,992 at the 2001 census. In 2009, the population of Khndzoresk comprised 2256 people, of which 1126 were women and 1130 were men. There were 516 households in total.

The population of Khndzoresk since 1831 is as follows:

History    

In the end of the 19th century, Old Khndzoresk was the biggest village of Eastern Armenia. In the beginning of the 20th century the community had 8300 inhabitants (1800 households). In 1913 there were 27 shops, 3 dye-houses, tanneries, 7 schools. The village is famous for taking part in the liberation movement of David Bek. The fortress of Khndzoresk served as a military base for Mkhitar Sparapet in 1728–1730. In 1735 the village was visited by Catholicos (Head of Armenian Apostolic Church) Abraham Kretatsi who gave a thorough description of the community in his chronicles. During the 1980s, an additional village sprouted  from Khndzoresk due to resizing and political unrest. This village, considerably smaller than Khndzoresk,  is called Lower Khndzoresk, or Nerkin Khndzoresk.

Cultural heritage 

Khndzoresk is widely famous for its canyon with picturesque rock formations and ancient cave settlement. The artificial caves, some of which are currently used as stables and warehouses, used to be inhabited till the 1950s. In the bottom of the gorge there is St. Hripsime church, dated back to 17th century. On a spur beyond on the right side of the gorge there is Anapat (hermitage) with the tomb of Mkhitar Sparapet. The cave church of St. Tatevos can also be found nearby.

Economy and culture  
About 90% of the population is involved in agriculture (animal husbandry and gardening). There is a small milk processing enterprise, employing 8 people. The community has a number of administrative and public institutions, such as a community council, a secondary school (with 370 pupils), a musical school, a kindergarten, a library, a museum and a culture club.

Climate    
The climate in the community is warm, relatively humid, with mild winters. Annual precipitation is 450-700mm.

Genetics 
Surprisingly, most of the villagers have been found to belong to Y-DNA Haplogroup R1b, specifically to a Western European branch of L754 > L389 > P297 > M269 > L23 > L51 > L52 > L151 > P312 > DF27 > Y3267 > Y7365 > Y28672 > Y7363 > Y41095 > Y41710 > Y42667. Closest Europeans from France. As of November 2021 the closest common ancestor of these French and Khndzoresk people lived about 1150 years ago. Origins are being explored in a Y-DNA project with the company FamilyTreeDNA.

References 

Populated places in Syunik Province